Cinéast(e)s is a 2013 French documentary film about filmmakers who are women. Julie Gayet interviews twenty-one French female filmmakers about the relevance of gender to filmmaking and the issues encountered by women in making films. It begins with the question: "is cinema gendered?"

Cast

Mona Achache
Lisa Azuelos
Josiane Balasko
Valeria Bruni Tedeschi
Julie Delpy
Lola Doillon
Valérie Donzelli
Pascale Ferran
Nicole Garcia
Julie Gayet
Mia Hansen-Løve

Tonie Marshall
Patricia Mazuy
Yolande Moreau
Géraldine Nakache
Katell Quillévéré
Brigitte Roüan
Céline Sciamma
Agnès Varda
Rebecca Zlotowski

References

External links
 

2013 films
2013 documentary films
Documentary films about film directors and producers
Documentary films about women in film
Films shot in France

French documentary films
2010s French films